A catchwater device is a large-scale man-made device for catching surface runoff from hills and the sky from precipitation by channeling it to reservoirs for commercial and domestic use later. Freshwater is a scarce natural resource due to pollution, droughts, and overpopulation. Catchwater is a sustainable mechanism to increase freshwater in areas facing droughts or polluted waterways.

Types

Catchwater drains 

Catchwater drains may take the form of concrete canals, such as in Hong Kong, where there are many.  Alternatively, they may take the form of a large concrete sheet, smothering a hill, and preventing rainfall from entering the rock strata, with a smaller channeling system for transport of the water to the storage tank - this latter system is in operation in Gibraltar. In Hong Kong there are approximately 120 km of concrete channels, used as gutters built along hillsides in order to direct freshwater runoff into reservoirs for local water consumption. These catchwaters can overflow, causing dangerous hazards, erosive streams and blockages.

Earthship drains 
An earthship drain is water that is collected from impervious surfaces that are channeled into cisterns. A cistern is a well located underground. The water within these underground wells is heated by the sun. The water that is stored is used in domestic ways for washing dishes and bathing. Once water is used it is cycled and filtered in a module to be reused again

Rain barrels 

Rainwater tanks, also known as rain barrels in North America, are used to collect runoff coming from precipitation to prevent contamination from entering waterways. The only use of water  from rain barrels is used for commercial use such as gardening and agriculture. Rain barrels are large containers that are connected to buildings through a gutter system which catches runoff from roofs. Many households use rain barrels as a substitute for a to reduce the amount of water they waste for recreational activities.

Rain gardens 

A Rain garden is a depression in the ground covered by vegetation that helps filter and restore freshwater back into the water cycle.  Rain gardens are used to decrease the speed of water by capturing the water, so it does not become surface runoff through infiltrating the soil.

Advantages and disadvantages

Sustainability  

Some drains are able to self-maintain through geomorphological equilibrium. Catchwater drains are predominantly used for agriculture. Agriculture uses the water to in catchwater drains for irrigation and the use for controlling flooding or other functions to direct large amounts of water away from crops during wet seasons. Catchwater drains also allow communities to wore down the water tables when they need to an allow the retentive of the water table to be restore after times of heavy use.

Environmental safety  
Catchwater drains need a lot of landscaping and management.
Rain gardens are not suitable for steep slopes unlike other types of catchwater drain 
Gardens can get congested and become impervious if land around the garden is not managed
Due to the expense of these systems, they are generally only to be found where there is an extreme shortage of freshwater, because of geographical or political issues.

References

Water supply
Stormwater management